The M56 submachine gun is a Yugoslavian submachine gun chambered in 7.62×25mm Tokarev, designed for use with the Yugoslav People's Army. Initially a state-funded product, it was later produced by Zastava Arms and saw use in a number of conflicts following the breakup of former Yugoslavia. The M56 is based on the MP 40 submachine gun captured from Nazi Germany, easily distinguished from the MP 40 by its increased length and curved magazine.

Inexpensive and simple to produce and maintain, the M56 also proved to be quite effective at range over its German counterpart due to its   7.62×25mm cartridge having significantly higher velocity than the 9×19mm round used by the MP 40.

Internally the M56 lacks the telescoping recoil spring found in the MP 40. The magazine release also differs and is located directly behind the magazine instead of on the side of the receiver on the MP 40. The M56 also uses a double feed magazine (similarly to the Soviet PPS) contrary to the single feed magazines used on the MP 40. The M56 has a fire selector switch allowing the operator to fire in either semi or fully automatic which the MP 40 did not have. Disassembly also differed with the gun being taken apart via a rear end cap, separating the lower and upper receivers while the MP 40 this was accomplished by a button on the lower receiver located behind the magazine well. Another change from the MP 40 is that the M56 lacks the Bakelite resting bar below the barrel on the MP 40

Users

References

External links
Zastava Arms official website

7.62×25mm Tokarev submachine guns
MP 38 derivatives
Simple blowback firearms
Submachine guns of Yugoslavia
Weapons and ammunition introduced in 1956